Audrey McManiman (born 24 January 1995) is a Canadian snowboarder who competes internationally in the snowboard cross discipline, and formerly in the freestyle events.

Career

Freestyle
McManiman made her debut for Canada at the inaugural Winter Youth Olympics in 2012. McManiman won the gold medal in the slopestyle event. MacManiman would compete in a few World Cup events between 2012 and 2015, topped off by competing at the 2015 World Championships. In January 2016, McManiman had a serious crash in training and after recovery switched her focus to competing in the snowboard cross discipline.

Snowboard cross
At the 2019 Winter Universiade in Krasnoyarsk, McManiman won bronze in the women's snowboard cross event.

In January 2022, McManiman was named to Canada's 2022 Olympic team in the snowboard cross event.

References

External links
 

1995 births
Living people
Canadian female snowboarders
Youth Olympic gold medalists for Canada
Snowboarders at the 2012 Winter Youth Olympics
Snowboarders at the 2022 Winter Olympics
Olympic snowboarders of Canada